Callichlamys is a genus of planthoppers, those planthoppers of the family Achilidae. The genus was described in 1907.

References

Species described in 1907
Achilidae
Auchenorrhyncha genera